Matt McMahon is an Australian jazz pianist and composer. Winning the 'Wangaratta National Jazz Piano Award' in 1999, and the 'Freedman Jazz Fellowship' in 2005 established his place in Australian jazz. In 2010 his trio supported the Wayne Shorter Quartet at Sydney Opera House. Additionally he has played or recorded with many known jazz artists including Dale Barlow, Greg Osby, Phil Slater, Joseph Tawadros, Katie Noonan, Dave Panichi and Steve Hunter.

Three of the CDs he recorded with Joseph Tawadros won the Australian Recording Industry Award for the best New World Music Album.

In 2014, McMahon leads his own band 'The Matt McMahon Trio' with bassist Jonathan Brown and drummer Simon Barker, and co-leads the "Band of Five Names" with trumpeter Phil Slater and drummer Simon Barker. He is the musical director for Australian jazz vocalist and trumpeter Vince Jones. He has performed at music festivals in Australia and Asia, including the Wangaratta Festival of Jazz and JazzNow Festival. In 2014 he teaches in the jazz department at Sydney Conservatorium of Music.

He is also a featured artist on the educational website for improvising musicians, jazztuition.com, alongside Simon Barker, Brett Hirst and Ken Stubbs.

Discography

As a bandleader 
Paths and Streams, Kimnara 2007 (debut as a leader), 
Ellipsis, Kimnara 2007
The Voyage of Mary and William 2015.

As a sideman 
Joseph Tawadros, Angel, 2008
Joseph Tawadros, The Hour of Separation (independent release), 2010
Joseph Tawadros, Concerto of the Greater Sea, 2012
Joseph Tawadros, Chameleons of the White Shadow, 2013
Joseph Tawadros,Permission to Evaporate, 2014
Joseph Tawadros, Truth Seekers, Lovers & Warriors, 2015
Leigh Carriage, Mandarin Skyline (Vitamin Records)
BAECASTUFF: Out of This World

References

External links
 http://abcjazz.net.au/artist/matt-mcmahon
 http://ausjazz.net/tag/matt-mcmahon/
 http://www.jazzandbeyond.com.au/artists.html
 http://www.sima.org.au
 http://www.birdland.com.au
 http://music.sydney.edu.au
http://jazztuition.com

Year of birth missing (living people)
Living people
Australian jazz pianists
Australian jazz composers
Male jazz composers
Male pianists
21st-century pianists
21st-century Australian male musicians
21st-century Australian musicians